One Fine Morning is a 2022 romantic drama film written and directed by Mia Hansen-Løve. It stars Léa Seydoux, Pascal Greggory, Melvil Poupaud and Nicole Garcia. The film premiered in the Directors' Fortnight section of the Cannes Film Festival on 20 May 2022. At Cannes, the film won the Europa Cinemas Label Award for Best European Film.

Plot
Sandra Kienzler is raising a young daughter, Linn, and working as an interpreter. She often checks in on her father, Georg, who is losing his sight and memory and needs to move to an assisted living facility. Sandra also reconnects with an old friend, Clément, who is married, and the two develop a secret romantic relationship.

Cast
 Léa Seydoux as Sandra Kienzler
 Pascal Greggory as Georg Kienzler, Sandra's father
 Melvil Poupaud as Clément, an old friend of Sandra
 Nicole Garcia as Françoise, Sandra's mother and Georg's ex-wife
 Fejria Deliba as Leïla, Georg's companion
 Camille Leban Martins as Linn, Sandra's daughter
 Sarah Le Picard as Elodie Kienzler, Sandra's sister
 Pierre Meunier as Michel

Production
In September 2020, it was announced Léa Seydoux, Pascal Greggory, Melvil Poupaud, and Nicole Garcia had joined the cast of the film, with Mia Hansen-Løve directing from a screenplay she wrote. Principal photography began in June 2021 in Paris.

Release
In June 2021, it was announced Mubi was producing the film, and Les films du losange and Weltkino Film to distribute the film in France and Germany, respectively. It was released in France on 5 October 2022, and was released in Germany on 8 December 2022. It was invited to the 28th Kolkata International Film Festival and was screened on 16 December 2022. The film will be released by Sony Pictures Classics in North America, Latin America, and the Middle East.

Reception
On the review aggregator website Rotten Tomatoes, the film holds an approval rating of 92% based on 84 reviews, with an average rating of 8.2/10. Metacritic, which uses a weighted average, assigned the film a score of 86 out of 100, based on 30 reviews, indicating "universal acclaim".

References

External links
 

2022 films
2022 romantic drama films
2020s French films
2020s French-language films
2020s German films
Arte France Cinéma films
Films directed by Mia Hansen-Løve
Films shot in Paris
French romantic drama films
French-language German films
German romantic drama films